Stipe Delić (23 June 1925 – 1 April 1999) was a Croatian film director. His 1973 film The Battle of Sutjeska was entered into the 8th Moscow International Film Festival where it won a Special Prize.

Selected filmography
 The Battle of Sutjeska (1973)

References

External links

1925 births
1999 deaths
Croatian film directors
People from Makarska